In algebraic geometry, a logarithmic pair consists of a variety, together with a divisor along which one allows mild logarithmic singularities.

Definition
A boundary Q-divisor on a variety is a Q-divisor D  of the form ΣdiDi where the Di are the distinct irreducible components of D and all coefficients are rational numbers with 0≤di≤1.

A logarithmic pair, or log pair for short, is a pair (X,D) consisting of a normal variety X and a boundary Q-divisor D.

The log canonical divisor of a log pair (X,D) is K+D where K is the canonical divisor of X.

A logarithmic 1-form on a log pair (X,D) is allowed to have logarithmic singularities of the form
d log(z) = dz/z along components of the   divisor  given locally by z=0.

References

Algebraic geometry